"Dreamworld" is a song by American R&B singer Robin Thicke. It is the fifth track from his third studio album Something Else. It was released as the third and final single from the album on March 4, 2009. It did not enter the R&B/Hip-Hop Songs chart, but peaked at number 10 on Bubbling Hot R&B/Hip-Hop Songs and number 32 on Hot Adult R&B Airplay. A music video for the song was released in 2009. It was directed by Anthony Mandler.

Charts

References 

2008 songs
Robin Thicke songs
Songs written by Robin Thicke